Phthalein dyes are a class of dyes mainly used as pH indicators, due to their ability to change colors depending on pH.  They are formed by the reaction of phthalic anhydride with various phenols. They are a subclass of triarylmethane dyes.

Common phthalein dyes include:

Bromothymol blue
Bromocresol green
Bromocresol purple
Cresol Red
 o-Cresolphthalein
 Chlorophenol red
 Dixylenolphthalein
 Guaiacolphthalein
 α-Naphtholphthalein
 Phenolphthalein
 Phenolsulfonphthalein
 Tetrabromophenolphthalein
 Thymol blue
 Thymolphthalein
 Xylenolphthalein

See also
Triarylmethane dye

References

Triarylmethane dyes
Phthalides